In enzymology, a lactosylceramide beta-1,3-galactosyltransferase is an enzyme that catalyzes the chemical reaction

UDP-galactose + D-galactosyl-1,4-beta-D-glucosyl-R  UDP + D-galactosyl-1,3-beta-D-galactosyl-1,4-beta-D-glucosyl-R

Thus, the two substrates of this enzyme are UDP-galactose and D-galactosyl-1,4-beta-D-glucosyl-R, whereas its two products are UDP and D-galactosyl-1,3-beta-D-galactosyl-1,4-beta-D-glucosyl-R.

This enzyme belongs to the family of glycosyltransferases, specifically the hexosyltransferases.  The systematic name of this enzyme class is UDP-galactose:D-galactosyl-1,4-beta-D-glucosyl-R beta-1,3-galactosyltransferase. Other names in common use include uridine diphosphogalactose-lactosylceramide, and beta1->3-galactosyltransferase.

References

 

EC 2.4.1
Enzymes of unknown structure